Dan Singh Yadav (born 9 May 1959) is an Indian politician and Member of the Legislative Assembly (India) representing the Mahendragarh constituency. Dan Singh is a member of the Indian National Congress party.

He was President of LBS College, Jaipur, and General Secretary of the Haryana Pradesh Youth Congress. He was elected to the Legislative Assembly in 2000, 2005, 2009 and 2019.

Personal life 
Singh was born in 1959 in Pahlad Garh. He was educated in Chandigarh and Jaipur and attained Master of Arts, LL.B and M.B.A degrees, as well as a Diploma in Labour Law. He married Sandhya Singh and they have two children.

His son, Akshat Singh Yadav is married to daughter of Mr. Rao Narbir Singh, Cabinet Minister, Government of Haryana.

Career graph
2000 – MLA (Mahendragarh constituency)
2005 – MLA (Mahendragarh constituency)
2009 – MLA (Mahendragarh constituency)
2012 onward – President, Haryana Football Association
2019 - MLA (Mahendragarh constituency) 
2012 onward – Vice-President, Haryana Olympic Association

References

External links
 Official Website
 Rao Dan Singh on Facebook

Indian National Congress politicians
Living people
1959 births
People from Mahendragarh
Haryana MLAs 2019–2024